Joseph Anthony Lala (November 3, 1947 – March 18, 2014) was an American musician and actor. In 1966, he co-founded the rock band Blues Image.

Life and career
Lala was born in Ybor City, Tampa, Florida, to parents from Contessa Entellina (an ethnic Albanian community in Sicily). His father was Sicilian, and he left the family when Joe was a child, so he was raised by his mother on her own. Lala's mother, Janie Cacciatore, an avid dancer, took her son to as many shows as she could. Lala spoke fluent Spanish and Italian. He started out playing the drums in several Florida bands, before forming the band Blues Image. He also occasionally sang lead vocals, most notably on the song "Leaving My Troubles Behind". As a drummer and percussionist, he worked with The Byrds, Crosby, Stills, Nash & Young, Manassas, The Stills-Young Band, The Bee Gees, Whitney Houston, Joe Walsh, Andy Gibb and many others. He played the trademark congas that drove the Bee Gees' 1976 US chart-topper You Should Be Dancing, subsequently included on the multi-million selling Saturday Night Fever soundtrack. Lala provided the wide selection of percussive effects on Barbra Streisand's 1980 worldwide No. 1 album Guilty, and contributed to Whitney Houston's eponymous 1985 debut album. Throughout his career, Lala accumulated 32 gold records and 28 platinum records. He played on the movie soundtracks of Saturday Night Fever, Staying Alive, D.C. Cab, Streets of Fire, All the Right Moves, Breathless, Defiance, The Lonely Guy and Airplane!. A severe case of carpal tunnel syndrome ended Lala's career as a percussionist. It kept him from performing full-time, but he continued to record with Stephen Stills, Graham Nash, the acoustic band Firefall, Dan Fogelberg, Dolly Parton, Rod Stewart and many others. Joe Lala was the last in the drummer stool for the handful of concerts given in February 1973 by the disintegrating Byrds.

He made the most of his Italian-American background and his mastery of Spanish, Cuban and Puerto Rican accents with TV roles in Miami Vice, General Hospital, Melrose Place, Seinfeld, Hunter, and Who's the Boss?, and starred in a summer replacement show named Knight & Daye. He portrayed another native of Ybor City, Dr. Ferdie Pacheco, in Ali: An American Hero, and co-starred with Andy Garcia in For Love or Country: The Arturo Sandoval Story. His films included Active Stealth, Sugar Hill, On Deadly Ground, Deep Sleep, Havana (with Robert Redford), Out for Justice, Marked for Death, Eyewitness to Murder, and Born in East L.A., plus many more.

Lala also guest-starred on several animated shows; Batman: The Animated Series, Pinky and the Brain, Quack Pack, The Angry Beavers, The Adventures of Jimmy Neutron: Boy Genius, Danger Rangers, ChalkZone, Johnny Bravo, Ozzy & Drix, Superman: The Animated Series, The Woody Woodpecker Show (the 1999 version), and many more. Additionally, he voiced Kun Lan in the 2005 video game Killer7.

Lala was married to voice director Ginny McSwain from 1996 till their divorce in 2004.

He had ultimately walked away from the entertainment business in the mid-2000s in order to care for his mother, who had dementia. Lala coached young actors at the Italian Club in his native Ybor City.
Joe Lala died from complications of lung cancer on March 18, 2014, at the age of 66.

Filmography

Collaborations 

With Gypsy
 In the Garden (Metromedia Records – KMD 1044, 1971)

With Barbra Streisand
 Guilty (Columbia Records, 1980)

With Stephen Stills
 Manassas (Atlantic Records, 1972)
 Down the Road (Atlantic Records, 1973)
 Stills (Columbia Records, 1975)
 Illegal Stills (Columbia Records, 1976)
 Thoroughfare Gap (Columbia Records, 1978)
 Right by You (Atlantic Records, 1984)
 Man Alive! (Pryamid Records, 2005)

With Dionne Warwick
 Heartbreaker (Arista Records, 1982)

With David Crosby
 Oh Yes I Can (A&M Records, 1989)

With Joe Walsh
 The Smoker You Drink, the Player You Get (ABC Records, 1973)

With Dan Fogelberg
 Souvenirs (Epic Records, 1974)
 Nether Lands (Epic Records, 1977)
 Twin Sons of Different Mothers (Epic Records, 1978)
 The Innocent Age (Epic Records, 1981)
 Windows and Walls (Epic Records, 1984)
 Exiles (Epic Records, 1987)

With Don Felder
 Airborne (Asylum Records, 1983)

With Bill Wyman
 Monkey Grip (Atlantic Records, 1974)

With Ringo Starr
 Stop and Smell the Roses (RCA Records, 1981)

With Neil Diamond
 Beautiful Noise (Columbia Records, 1976)

With Jackson Browne
 Hold Out (Asylum Records, 1980)

With Kenny Rogers
 Eyes That See in the Dark (RCA Records, 1983)

With Graham Nash
 Earth & Sky (Capitol Records, 1980)
 Innocent Eyes (Atlantic Records, 1986)

With Neil Young
 Trans (Geffen, 1982)

With Rod Stewart
 A Night on the Town (Warner Bros. Records, 1976)

With Crosby, Stills, Nash & Young
 CSNY 1974 (Rhino Records, 2014)

References

External links

 

1947 births
2014 deaths
American rock drummers
American male voice actors
American male television actors
Blues Image members
Musicians from Tampa, Florida
Male actors from Tampa, Florida
Souther–Hillman–Furay Band members
Thomas Jefferson High School (Tampa, Florida) alumni
Male actors from Florida
Deaths from lung cancer in Florida
American rock percussionists
American session musicians
Timbaleros
Conga players
Bongo players
Tambourine players
Maracas players
Triangle players
Güiro players
American people of Italian descent
American people of Arbëreshë descent
Timpanists